Blake Nill (born February 16, 1962) is a former Canadian football defensive lineman and the current head coach for the University of British Columbia's football team, the UBC Thunderbirds. 

Previously, Nill had served as head coach for the Saint Mary's Huskies football team for eight years from 1998 to 2005. His Huskies teams appeared in four Vanier Cups, winning in 2001 and 2002 while losing in 2003 and 1999. He became head coach of the Calgary Dinos in 2006 where his teams had appeared in three Vanier Cups, losing all three times, in 2009, 2010, and 2014. In his first year as head coach of the Thunderbirds, he won his third Vanier Cup in 2015. As a professional player, he played for four seasons for the Montreal Concordes of the Canadian Football League. Collegiately, he played CIAU football for the Dinos.

References

External links
Calgary Dinos profile

1962 births
Living people
Calgary Dinos football players
Montreal Concordes players
Canadian football defensive linemen
People from Hanna, Alberta
Players of Canadian football from Alberta
St. Francis Xavier X-Men football coaches
Saint Mary's Huskies football coaches
Calgary Dinos football coaches
UBC Thunderbirds football coaches